Miyana is a genus of butterflies in the family Nymphalidae found in South East Asia.

Species
Miyana meyeri (Kirsch, 1877)
Miyana moluccana (Felder, 1860)

External links
"Miyana Fruhstorfer, 1914" at Markku Savela's Lepidoptera and Some Other Life Forms

Acraeini
Nymphalidae genera